The 2014 elections to Manchester City Council were held on 22 May 2014, on the same day as the 2014 United Kingdom local elections and the United Kingdom component of the 2014 European Parliament election. One-third of the council were up for election, with each successful candidate to serve a four-year term of office, expiring in 2018.

Election result
Changes in vote share are compared to the 2012 election.

Ward results
Councillors seeking re-election were elected in 2010 and are denoted with an asterisk. Changes in ward vote share are compared to the 2010 election.

Ancoats and Clayton

Ardwick

Baguley

Bradford

Brooklands

Burnage

Charlestown

Cheetham

Chorlton

Chorlton Park

City Centre

Crumpsall

Didsbury East

Didsbury West

Fallowfield

Gorton North

Gorton South

Harpurhey

Higher Blackley
Councillor Anna Trotman stood down for family reasons and was replaced in February 2016 by Paula Sadler, also of Labour in a by-election.

Hulme

Levenshulme

Longsight

Miles Platting and Newton Heath

Moss Side

Moston

Northenden

Old Moat

Rusholme

Sharston

Whalley Range

Withington

Woodhouse Park

References

Full list of results on the Manchester City Council website, here:

https://web.archive.org/web/20140527214233/http://www.manchester.gov.uk/info/362/elections_and_voting/4981/your_next_election/4

Manchester
2014
2010s in Manchester